Nadendla Manohar is an Indian politician who served as the Speaker of Andhra Pradesh Legislative Assembly. He was the last speaker of the United Andhra Pradesh before the formation of the Telangana state on 2 June 2014. Nadendla Manohar was sworn in as the 18th Speaker of Andhra Pradesh Legislative Assembly on 4 June 2011. A two-time Member of the Legislative Assembly in Andhra Pradesh. On 12 October 2018 he joined in Jana Sena Party.

Education
Nadendla Manohar is an MBA graduate from College of Commerce and Business Management, Osmania University, with specialization in Marketing and B.A. from Nizam College, Osmania University, Hyderabad.

Bio-Profile
Manohar was elected as the Speaker in June 2011. He is an elected Member of the Indian National Congress from Tenali Constituency of Guntur district in Andhra Pradesh in 2004 and 2009 General elections. He contested and lost in the 2014 elections.

Interests
Manohar was a nationally ranked Tennis player. He has participated in several tournaments in the country and abroad. He was Bronze Medallist in the National Games, 1986.

References

External links

 

Telugu politicians
Indian National Congress politicians from Andhra Pradesh
Living people
1964 births
Speakers of the Andhra Pradesh Legislative Assembly
Deputy Speakers of the Andhra Pradesh Legislative Assembly
Jana Sena Party politicians